The 2010 Superbike World Championship (officially known as the HANNspree SBK Superbike World Championship for sponsorship reasons) was the twenty-third season of the Superbike World Championship. It was the third season in which HANNspree had been the title sponsor of the championship.

After Leon Haslam's retirement during the second race at Imola, Max Biaggi became the first Italian winner of the championship, and also claimed the first title by an Aprilia rider.

Race calendar and results
The provisional 2010 race schedule was publicly announced by FIM on 6 October 2009 with the most notable change from the 2009 season being the dropping of the round at Losail, Qatar. For the first time in series history, races were run on a day other than Sunday, with the races at Miller Motorsports Park being held on Monday 31 May. These races were run as part of the Memorial Day weekend in the United States. The FIM altered the calendar on 22 January 2010 with Silverstone replacing Donington Park as the host of the British round.

Championship standings

Riders' standings

Manufacturers' standings

Entry list

All entries used Pirelli tyres.

References

External links

 
Superbike World Championship seasons
World